The 2009 Macau Grand Prix Formula Three was the 56th Macau Grand Prix race held on the streets of Macau on 22 November 2009. It was supported by the 2009 Guia Race of Macau. The TOM'S team were looking for their third Macau win in succession, after Oliver Jarvis and Keisuke Kunimoto won the race in the previous two years. TOM'S did start the weekend well, with Marcus Ericsson taking pole position in the combined qualifying session, but Signature dominated the rest of the weekend, with Jean-Karl Vernay taking the race victory in the qualifying race, and Edoardo Mortara taking the Macau Grand Prix itself.

Entry list
 All drivers competed in Dallara F308 chassis.

Report

Practice and qualifying
All-Japan Formula Three champion Marcus Ericsson was immediately on the pace, setting the fastest time in the first half-hour session that was held prior to the first qualifying session. Ericsson's lap was over half a second faster than has nearest rival Edoardo Mortara, with two of the three Carlin cars filling positions three and four, with Brendon Hartley just edging out Daniel Ricciardo by 0.019 seconds. Stefano Coletti and Valtteri Bottas rounded out the top six. During the session, four drivers hit the wall, including all three Fortec Motorsport cars, and the Prema Powerteam machine of Daniel Zampieri.

The first qualifying session saw Ericsson on top once again, improving his time by over a second from the practice session; but only secured the top spot, after a late crash by Signature's Laurens Vanthoor at Police, brought out a session-ending red flag. Ricciardo was top rookie as he ended up second, less than a tenth off the Swedish teenager's time. Having been usurped by those late runs, Mortara and Hartley wound up third and fourth, ahead of the first ART Grand Prix car of Sam Bird. Despite his late accident, Vanthoor finished sixth, ahead of Coletti, Hitech Racing's Mika Mäki, the third Signature machine of Formula 3 Euro Series veteran Jean-Karl Vernay and Bottas, who like Vanthoor, crashed during the session. Manor Motorsport cars filled row six with Carlos Huertas just shading Roberto Merhi by just 0.027 seconds, which put them ahead of the third Carlin of Max Chilton, the Räikkönen Robertson duo of Renger van der Zande (14th) and Alexander Sims (16th), with somewhat surprisingly, Formula 3 Euro Series champion Jules Bianchi splitting the pair, in fifteenth position. Ericsson's team-mate Takuto Iguchi was the fastest of the Japanese trio in seventeenth, ahead of Kei Cozzolino, Wayne Boyd, Koki Saga, Jake Rosenzweig, Yuji Kunimoto (the brother of 2008 winner Keisuke) and the Kolles & Heinz Union pair of Stef Dusseldorp and Alexandre Imperatori. Rounding out the thirty runners were local favourite Michael Ho, British Formula 3 National Class champion Daniel McKenzie, the unwell Henry Arundel, Víctor García, Kevin Chen and Zampieri, who did not set a time after his crash in the earlier practice session.

A second thirty-minute practice session was held the following day, with Mortara setting the fastest time; the only driver to break into the 2:10s. His lap of 2:10.593, was an unofficial lap record as it was the fastest lap ever recorded at the Guia Circuit. It was more than a second under Marko Asmer's official lap record, set in 2007. Eight other drivers were also under the old mark, with tenth place Bianchi just outside the record. Ricciardo continued his fine form in second, despite not improving his time after a mid-session setup change. Bottas was third ahead of Hartley, Ericsson, Bird and the rest. Apart from an accident involving Chen at Maternity, this session passed relatively peacefully.

After topping the first qualifying session, Ericsson continued his form into second practice, recording the fastest lap in the history of the Macau Guia Circuit. His lap of 2:10.042 put him on pole position, despite hitting the barriers at Matsuya close to the end of qualifying, and damaging his rear wing. After setting the ninth-fastest time during the Thursday qualifying session, Vernay joined Ericsson on the front row after setting a time fractionally slower than his Swedish rival. Bottas lined up third, also moving up seven places from his Thursday position, and was joined on row two by Mortara. Ricciardo wound up in fifth position, after making an error at Lisboa which resulted in his front wing making slight contact with the barriers, and was the only other driver within a second of Ericsson's pace. The two remaining ART Grand Prix cars adorned row four with Bianchi edging out Bird, while the top ten was completed by Coletti and Mäki. Iguchi again finished up as the top Japanese runner in eleventh position, ahead of Hartley, who did not improve on his Thursday time and thus tumbled from row two to row six, as he recorded the thirteenth fastest time in the session. Merhi's twelfth-fastest time put him thirteenth in the classification, ahead of Sims, van der Zande, Kunimoto, Chilton and Boyd. Huertas held onto nineteenth overall, despite only being 26th in the session after suffering from engine gremlins that restricted him to just one flying lap. Rosenzweig, Cozzolino, Zampieri, García, Saga, Dusseldorp, Imperatori, Arundel, McKenzie, Ho and Chen completed the grid.

Qualification Race

After hitting the wall on countless occasions over the previous two days, Chen was withdrawn from the race due to a cracked monocoque. Thus, this left the grid at 29 for the 10-lap race, and Vernay got the jump on Ericsson away from the start-finish line, and took the lead into the first corner, but by the time the drivers had reached Lisboa, Ericsson was back in front just as the safety car came out. Further back, Bianchi rode over the rear wheel of Mortara at San Francisco, causing enough damage for the Frenchman to pit. Rosenzweig collided with the barriers at the Mandarin, which brought the safety car out for three laps. Arundel's Carlin car encountered mechanical troubles under the safety car, after some debris punctured a hole in the radiator of his Volkswagen engine. This left the order as Ericsson, Vernay, Mortara (who moved up despite his collision), Bottas, Ricciardo, Vanthoor, Bird, Coletti, Mäki and Hartley. Boyd moved up five positions at the start, as he was the biggest winner off the line.

At the lap four restart, Vernay made ground up on Ericsson, and managed to slipstream past the All-Japan Formula Three champion on the run to Lisboa. Ricciardo tried a similar move on Bottas but could not manage to complete the pass, and such was his momentum loss, Vanthoor managed to slip through on the Australian into fifth position. Another Carlin driver in the wars was Hartley, as he clouted Coletti out of eighth position. Over the succeeding laps, Asmer's lap record from 2007 took a pounding as first Mortara and then Vernay took the lap record into the 2:10 bracket. However, any further progress for the record to fall was halted by a huge accident that befell Boyd on lap seven. Running in eleventh position, the young Ulsterman pulled out to pass his team-mate Mäki on the exit of the Mandarin, but clipped the car's left rear wheel at 170 mph. Boyd's Dallara became airborne and was launched into a frightening aerial somersault, landing upside down before righting itself via a hit with the retaining wall. His car rebounded across the circuit, and was luckily avoided by every one of the cars around him on track. The crash meant the last three laps of the race were completed behind the safety car, and pulled in to allow the cars to pass across the line without overtaking. This allowed Vernay to win the race, securing pole position for the main race on Sunday. Ericsson was second ahead of Mortara – once he had returned the place back to the Swede – with Bottas, Vanthoor, Ricciardo, Bird, Iguchi, Merhi and Mäki completing the top ten. Outside the top ten were van der Zande, Kunimoto, Sims, García, Chilton, Cozzolino, Dusseldorp, Saga, Huertas, Zampieri, Bianchi and Coletti after their respective collisions, Imperatori, Hartley, McKenzie and Ho rounded out the 26 classified finishers.

Warm-up
A twenty-minute warm-up session was held on the morning of the main race. Mortara again managed to squeeze out Ericsson to top the timesheets, with Coletti also being within a tenth of a second from the fastest time. Ricciardo was fourth ahead of Bottas, van der Zande, Sims, Chilton, Merhi and the qualification race winner Vernay. Ho and Boyd did not set times during the session, with the Ulsterman's Hitech Racing car looking unlikely to start the race after his accident on Saturday.

Main Race

After his victory in the qualification race, Vernay started from pole position with Ericsson starting alongside, with Mortara and Bottas on row two. Due to damage inflicted in his spectacular accident the previous day, Boyd did not start, thus leaving the grid at 28 cars. Once again, Ericsson made an awful getaway, with Bottas and Mortara both slotting in behind a fast-starting Vernay. Into Lisboa, Ricciardo got alongside Ericsson as they battled for fourth with the Australian brushing the wall and the two continued side by side into San Francisco, with Ricciardo again nudging the wall. Behind them, Vanthoor left his braking far too late for Lisboa, and mounted over Chilton, which caused the teenage Briton to retire on the spot. Ricciardo's clip with the wall caused a left-rear puncture, but he managed to carry on up the hill, until he crashed at the entrance to the Solitude Esses. His car rebounded off the wall, and into direct line of the rest of the field. No less than half a dozen cars impacted with the stricken car, and blocked the track which ultimately led to a red flag, and a race suspension. Also taken out in the incident were the third Carlin of Hartley, the Premas of Coletti and Zampieri, the Fortecs of Rosenzweig and McKenzie, and Ho. Imperatori was also involved, returning to the pits for a lengthy period, but returned to complete three laps towards the end. Vanthoor, with a damaged front wheel after his collision with Chilton, stopped just short of the accident site, and was thus able to continue in the race.

After a lap behind the safety car, the field were let loose again at the beginning of lap three. Vernay closed in on his Italian team-mate, slipstreaming past him on the run to the Mandarin, and doing enough to hold off Mortara into Lisboa. For the ensuing laps, Vernay was doing what he had to do to keep his team-mate, who had stepped back from GP2 to rid himself of his close defeat to Keisuke Kunimoto in the previous year's race. Further back, Bianchi, who had avoided the first lap incidents was quietly moving his way up the field, and was eleventh by the end of lap seven. Sims had also dropped to the tail of the field, after a move on Cozzolino failed, and he made an unscheduled trip up the Lisboa escape road. Mortara started charging back towards Vernay, and in the process, broke the Frenchman's lap record set the day before. Mortara lowered it to a lap of 2:10.732, lapping the circuit at close to 105 mph, and well under the previous record held by Marko Asmer. Cozzolino exited the race on lap eleven, crashing at Black Sands without the need for the safety car to reappear.

The race's decisive moment also occurred on lap eleven. Coming out of the Melco Hairpin, Vernay fluffed a gear shift, and Mortara moved within half a second of him. At the line, Vernay's lead was 0.4 seconds, Mortara was in his slipstream, and the pass seemed inevitable. Sure enough, Mortara lined him up, and overtook him into Lisboa. Bird took fourth from Ericsson on the same lap, and looked set to finish behind team-mate Bottas; a far cry from his first-lap exit in 2008 after being taken out by Räikkönen Robertson Racing's Roberto Streit on the run to Mandarin. Mortara cruised to victory, winning by 1.1 seconds ahead of Vernay. Drama struck Bottas on the final lap, when he encountered a problem with one of his wheels. This cost him a podium, as both Bird and Ericsson managed to pass him. Merhi had been set for sixth, but hit the barriers at Lisboa on the final lap, and ended up being classified seventeenth. This promoted the second TOM'S car of Iguchi into sixth, ahead of van der Zande, Mäki, Kunimoto and Bianchi, who made the top ten at Merhi's expense, making up eleven positions in fifteen laps. Outside the top ten were García, Huertas, Vanthoor, Saga, Dusseldorp and Arundel. Missing from the list was Sims, who retired on the final lap with a misfire. He was classified behind Merhi in eighteenth and last.

Classification

Qualifying
 Qualifying is split into two sessions, both of which being 45 minutes. One session was held on 19 November and another was held on 20 November, with the best times of each driver counting towards the grid for the qualifying race.

1. – Huertas, Zampieri and Imperatori were sent to the back of the field, due to engine changes after the second qualifying session. They were reassigned into positions 27–29 in the order they finished in that session.
2. – Chen had been due to start 30th, but was withdrawn with accident damage.

Qualification Race

Main Race

References

External links
 The official website of the 56th Macau Grand Prix

Macau
Macau Grand Prix
Macau Grand Prix
Macau Grand Prix Formula Three